The 2002 World Darts Trophy was the first edition of the World Darts Trophy, a professional darts tournament held at the De Vechtsebanen in Utrecht, the Netherlands, run by the British Darts Organisation and the World Darts Federation.

The final of the first men's event was between Tony David and Tony O'Shea, with Tony David beating Tony O'Shea in straight sets, 6–0. The BDO World Champion Mervyn King was eliminated in the second round also in straight sets by Tony David. In the final of the first women's event, Mieke de Boer defeated Crissy Howat, 3–1 in sets. Trina Gulliver, the BDO World Champion, was earlier beaten in the women's event by Anne Kirk in the quarter finals.

Seeds

Men
  John Walton
  Martin Adams
  Mervyn King
  Raymond van Barneveld
  Marko Pusa
  Jarkko Komula
  Andy Fordham
  Bob Taylor

Prize money

Men

Men's Tournament

Women's Tournament

References 

Darts in the United Kingdom